, better known as , is a Japanese actress and entertainer who is represented by the talent agency, Japan Music Entertainment.

Yazawa graduated from Chiba Prefectural Funabashi Code High School. Her husband is K-1 kick-boxer Masato.

Yazawa debuted in the film Bounce ko Gals after passing the audition in 1997.

Her first lead role was in the film Scramble Hearts in 2004.

Biography
Yazawa was born and raised in Tokyo, and went to elementary school in Fukuoka Prefecture. She returned to Tokyo for going to Hakata High School and modeling for the magazine, Egg. Yazawa later returned to Fukuoka and starting her entertainment debut.

On February 11, 2007, she married K-1 kick-boxer Masato after reporting that they were dating. It happened when Yazawa noticed Masato after she and her friends driven to the back of his house to travel to Mikane and became friends. Their marriage conference anniversary was held on February 13.

She is close friends with Eiko Koike from high school. They appeared in the drama, Naomi, and in the films, Kamikaze Girls and Yama Onna Kabe Onna.

On April 4, 2008, Yazawa became a Friday regular in the Tokyo Broadcasting System information program, Hanamaru Market.

Filmography

TV series

Films

References

External links
Official profile 
 

Japanese actresses
Japanese entertainers
1981 births
Living people
People from Tokyo